Tony Scherman  (August 13, 1950 – February 28, 2023) was Canadian painter. He was known for his use of encaustic and portraiture to depict events of historical, cultural and popular significance.

Early Life, education and career 
Scherman was born in Toronto, and grew up in Europe and London. His father Paul Scherman, a conductor and violinist, and mother settled in Paris in 1955. Paul Scherman relocated to London England by 1958. Tony Scherman arrived by 1959, to live with his father.

Scherman first attended the Byam Shaw School of Art and graduated with an MA from the Royal College of Art in 1974. While at the Royal College of Art, Scherman was introduced to encaustic by his tutor John Golding. The College acquired a painting for the collection from Scherman's thesis exhibition, and in 1976 he was included in the notable and controversial exhibition  The Human Clay  organized by artist R.B. Kitaj for Arts Council of Great Britain (now Arts Council England). Scherman was the youngest of the 48 artists, which included Frank Auerbach, Francis Bacon, David Hockney, Peter Bake, and Henry Moore. The exhibition originated at the Hayward Gallery London and toured galleries in England, Wales, Scotland and Belgium.

Return to Canada 
Scherman returned to Toronto with wife British artist Margaret Priest in 1976. He was soon recognized as an emerging artist with a growing international presence. He continued to be based in Toronto with more than 100 solo exhibitions in Canada, the United States, England and Europe and has been a visiting lecturer at numerous universities, art schools and public galleries in England, Canada and the United States since the mid-1970s. Scherman was a sessional instructor at the University of Guelph Department of Fine Art  and an adjunct professor at the University of Toronto School of Architecture and Landscape Architecture in the 1980s and 1990s. In 1987, he was one of 48 Canadian artists commissioned by the Cineplex Odeon Corporation for works to be installed in cinema complexes in Canada and the United States. His 5.18 metre wide painting The Comfort of Food was installed at the Cinemas in Oakbrook a suburb of Chicago. Scherman was part of the competition team for the Toronto public commission Cloud Gardens in the 1990s. In 2015, Scherman was commissioned by Western University to paint the portrait of former Chancellor Joseph Rotman. His painting Poseidon, 2007, is featured on the cover of Dr. Gerald Cupchik's book The Aesthetics of Emotion, Up the Down Staircase of the Mind-Body. In 2005, Scherman was elected to the Royal Canadian Academy of the Arts.

Death 
Scherman died from cancer on February, 28, 2023, at the age of 72.

Artistic practice and themes 
Scherman’s work considers the human condition in paintings and works on paper that are done in thematic series. These visual investigations are drawn from the mythologies of antiquity, the narratives and characters of the Shakespearean tragedies, Hamlet and Macbeth, and historical events that have formed and shaped the world today. Scherman, however, does not rely on illustrating dramatic moments, a characteristic of history painting, but employs a range of subject matter—portraits, animals, flowers and food—as stand-ins and visual metaphor, and imagining what is not written.  His Macbeth paintings from the mid-1990s were given the series title Banquo’s Funeral. While Banquo was murdered in Shakespeare’s play, the funeral was not written in.  Curator Karen Antaki wrote: “Scherman suspends the…narrative frame and proceeds to invent his own meta-text and to plot its wayward course.”

About 1789, Chasing Napoleon and Unthinkable Thoughts 
In the late 1990s, Scherman addressed the social and political upheaval of the French Revolution, which he titled About 1789. As with his mythology and literature sources, Scherman created a meta-text through images in order to present a visual language beyond dramatic moments. In contrast to Eugène Delacroix’s 1830 heroic-image painting Liberty Leading the People Scherman devised Jacques: The New Boss   The rooster is an old Gallic symbol revived to express national resurgence during The French Revolution and now the unofficial national symbol of France. This cycle of paintings and works on paper culminated in the exhibition Chasing Napoleon. The architects and minor figures of the First French Empire, Napoleonic France and the Third Reich were intertwined in a narrative of tyranny, ambitions and inflicted suffering. Critic Jacques Henric underscored the complexities of About 1789 and Chasing Napoleon: “The French Revolution is not only the preparation, the dress rehearsal and the quintessence of what would constitute the horrible grandeur and the superb infamy of the centuries that followed [but also the] perfectly monstrous utopia that the 20th century would attempt to bring about: to make a new mankind.” 

Scherman expressed the horror of the Third Reich in a painting with a horse subject for Oradour. A horse is depicted grazing in a meadow but the title refers to the massacre of French civilians by the German Waffen-SS in 1944, but as Scherman has noted, the painting’s significance is absent if the massacre is not known by a viewer; “the panting’s meaning is that it’s just a horse painting [and that] happens with all art all the time.”   The Chasing Napoleon exhibition  was organized by Curatorial Assistance Travelling Exhibitions  and toured to public galleries in the United States and Canada in 2001-2002.

A related exhibition Unthinkable Thoughts, with a focus on works on paper, circulated to galleries in Canada in 2004-2007.

About 1865 
Scherman’s 2007 historical painting series addressed the American Civil War. Critic Lilly Wei wrote that Scherman chose the conflict because “it was the first war fought on moral terms…an ethical war and a necessary work, premised on the belief that slavery was a non-negotiable evil.”  As with his previous series, there are portraits, animals and food  and imagined moments;  several works are titled “The Dreams of Robert E. Lee." Lee was the commander of the Confederate States Army.

The Blue Highway and Difficult Women 
Portraiture has been a critical aspect of Tony Scherman’s painting series. For The Blue Highway, 1999-2002, he worked from photograph sources to depict celebrities who died young and under tragic circumstances. Three of the subjects were musician and performers Jim Morrison, Elvis Presley, and Kurt Cobain. The subjects for Difficult Women  came from diverse walks of life, historical to contemporary, including activists, philosophers, political figures, athletes and celebrities. Scherman stated that the term difficult "is often reserved for women of principle and determination; it is rarely applied to men".

Public collections

England 
 Arts Council England
 Contemporary Arts Society, London 
 Royal College of Art, London
 Salford Museum

Europe 
 Centre Pompidou, Paris 
 FRAC Ile-de-France, Paris 
 Lieu d’art contemporain, Sigean, France 
 Schlossmuseum Murnau, Germany 
 Fundación Privada Sorigué, Lleida, Spain

United States, selected 
 High Museum Atlanta 
 Hunter Museum 
 Johnson Museum of Art, Cornell University 
 San Diego Museum of Art 
 Williams College Museum of Art

Canada, selected 
 Agnes Etherington Art Centre   
 Art Gallery of Alberta 
 Art Gallery of Greater Victoria 
 Art Gallery of Hamilton 
 Art Gallery of Nova Scotia 
 Art Gallery of Ontario 
 Art Gallery of Windsor 
 Art Museums University of Toronto 
 Beaverbrook Art Gallery 
 Canada Council Art Bank 
 Canadian Centre for Architecture 
 Dalhousie Art Gallery 
 Glenbow Museum 
 Kelowna Art Gallery 
 Kenderine Art Gallery 
 Leonard & Bina Ellen Art Gallery, Concordia University 
 McMaster Museum of Art 
 McMichael Canadian Art Collection 
 Montreal Museum of Fine Arts 
 Museum London  
 The Robert McLaughlin Gallery 
 University of Lethbridge Art Gallery 
 Winnipeg Art Gallery 
 Woodstock Art Gallery

Publications

References

Other sources
Robert L. Picus, "Dreaming of Jocasta: Tony Scherman's `Seduction of Oedipus' is sophisticated, powerful", The San Diego Union-Tribune, June 12, 2003, Sec. Ent., p. 36.

External links
 
 
 
 
 
Official site
Bio 
Images of Available Work

1950 births
2023 deaths
20th-century Canadian male artists
20th-century Canadian painters
21st-century Canadian male artists
21st-century Canadian painters
Alumni of the Royal College of Art
Artists from Toronto
Canadian male painters
Members of the Royal Canadian Academy of Arts